Gümüşgün, historically Ehnesh or Ehneş, is a village in the Nizip District, Gaziantep Province, Turkey.

History 
The village was inhabited by Armenians prior to the Armenian genocide. In the 1930s, a rich Jewish landlord from Aintab possessed a lot of land in the village, which was noted as Kurdish. The village is inhabited by Muhacir Turks from Thessaloniki who settled in the village after the population exchange between Greece and Turkey.

References

Villages in Nizip District
Kurdish settlements in Gaziantep Province
Former Armenian communities in Turkey